Alan Philip Smith (born 19 June 1964) is a New Zealand sailor who has sailed at the Summer Olympics and in 8 America's Cup campaigns.

Sailing career

He sailed with Toshiba during the 1997–98 Whitbread Round the World Race.

He represented New Zealand at the 2000 Summer Olympics, sailing with Rod Davis and Don Cowie in the Soling class. The team Sailing at the 2000 Summer Olympics – Soling finished second in the fleet racing and ended the match racing in 5th Place just out of the medal round.

Along with earlier Americas cup campaigns he sailed with OneWorld Challenge in the 2003 Louis Vuitton Cup, before returning to Luna Rossa Challenge for the 2007 Louis Vuitton Cup.

He joined Oracle Racing for the 2010 America's Cup, before spending time with Mascalzone Latino, sailing with them in the Louis Vuitton Trophy events.

From 2011 to 2017 he was a team member of Ran racing TP52 and Maxi 72 Inshore Pitman, Offshore Trim.

In 2012 Alan Smith was German Olympic star coach to team Stanjek and Kleen.

In 2013 he competed in the Middle Sea Race on Morning Glory, his team won the regatta.

In 2015 he joined the Maxi 72, Momo program for Inshore and Offshore Racing including Fastnet and Middle Sea Races. Position aboard included runner trimmer inshore, offshore helming and trimming duties.

He raced the Dragon World Championship 2015 in La Rochelle with Hasso Plattner as his tactician.

From 2015 to 2019 Alan Smith worked as the tactician on SY Rebecca.

In 2016 he sailed as the tactician on Rodney Jones' Farr40 Kindergarten in the Rolex Farr 40 World Championship. The team won the 8th race of the regatta.

In 2017 he was a member of the crew on yacht Proteus in the Maxi 72 Middle Sea Race. which retired early due to damage during that race.

From 2017 to 2018 he took positions as tactician/trim/bow on The Cure in the Australian-based Etchells regattas. The team made four wins in a row.

In 2018 Alan Smith sailed aboard Janda Baik, a DK46, at the Raja Muda Selangor International Regatta as a skipper and tactician.

2019 Phoenix Sailing Team during the 52 Super Series.

2019 Yacht Rebecca, SY Challenge Antigua and St Barts Bucket.

2019 Etchells Australia events including Etchells Melbourne.

2019 Offshore events with WA based IRC Farr 40 Enterprise, including the Rolex Sydney to Hobart Race winning in Division4.

2020 Etchells Melbourne, Australia. 

2020 Phoenix Sailing Team, 2nd place in the Cape Town 52 Super Series, South Africa.

2020 Yacht Rebecca, SY Challenge Antigua.

2021 coastal and offshore racing in Western Australia on board the Fast 40 Enterprise including the Naturalist Race and the Fremantle to Exmouth Race.

2021 Great Lakes 52 racing series, 5 events including the Chicago to Macinaw Island Race on yacht Vesper, which made second place for the season. Position pit/strategy. 

2021 SSL Gold Cup coaching team Malaysia during test event 1 in Switzerland, which made a 3rd place in test event 1

2021 IRC52 Nanoq won Les Voile de Saint-Tropez in its class. Position trimming.

2021 Middle Sea race  TP 52 Frecia Rossa. Tactics, player/coach 

2021 Alive Rp 66 Tactics, crew boss, runners, back up pit, offshore Helm.  180 mile cabbage tree island race, inshore racing and Sydney-Hobart race (retired due to Hull damage)

2022 events to date include Tp 52 Vesper 2 x Key West , M32 Extreme 2 support team for the season , Maxi 72 Vesper for St Barts and Newport events, 

Rebecca St barts bucket and Antigua super yacht challenge as their Tactician

Giraglia inshore and offshore racing TP52 Red Bandit, tactics.

Personal life 
Hobbies include road biking. Since 2004 he participated four times in the annual Lake Taupo Cycle Challenge in New Zealand. In March 2020, Alan participated in the Cape Town Cycle Tour in South Africa. Has three children that live in Australia. Follow Alan on Facebook.

References

External links
 
 
 
 

1964 births
Living people
People from Matamata
New Zealand male sailors (sport)
Volvo Ocean Race sailors
Luna Rossa Challenge sailors
Oracle Racing sailors
1987 America's Cup sailors
1988 America's Cup sailors
1992 America's Cup sailors
1995 America's Cup sailors
2000 America's Cup sailors
2003 America's Cup sailors
2007 America's Cup sailors
Sailors at the 2000 Summer Olympics – Soling
Olympic sailors of New Zealand
Sportspeople from Waikato